Mary Jeanne "Dolly" Hallstrom (December 26, 1924 – August 2, 2006) was an American nurse and politician.

Born in East Orange, New Jersey, Hallstrom went to Loyola University Chicago and had nursing training at St. Mary's Hospital in Evanston, Illinois. Hallstrom served in the Illinois House of Representatives from 1979 to 1983 and was a Republican. She then served on the Illinois Human Rights Commission. Hallstrom died in Evanston, Illinois.

Notes

1924 births
2006 deaths
People from Evanston, Illinois
Politicians from East Orange, New Jersey
Loyola University Chicago alumni
Women state legislators in Illinois
Republican Party members of the Illinois House of Representatives
20th-century American politicians
20th-century American women politicians
21st-century American women